Tonia Maria Zindel (born 15 July 1972) is a Swiss actress. She is known for her roles as Maja Lüthi in Lüthi und Blanc and Giulia in Amur senza fin.

Biography 
Zindel was born and raised in Scuol, Grisons. She is a native Romansh speaker. In 1992 she was admitted to the Acting Academy of Zürich. Her first major role was in the Swiss television film Crime Scene: Brainwashing. Later in the 1990s she landed roles in the Swiss television series The Director and the Swiss soap opera Lüthi und Blanc. Since 2000, she has had major roles in Swiss film and television including in Dolce Vita & Co, Charly's Comeback, Schellen-Ursli, and Amur senza fin.

She is married and has three children.

Filmography 
1993: The Lost Hole
1993: Crime scene : brainwashing
1993: Justice
1994-1995: The Director (TV series)
1998: A Deadly Relationship
1999: Bill Diamond - Story of a Moment
1999: The Stranger Girl
1999-2006: Lüthi und Blanc (TV series)
2002: Dolce Vita & Co (TV series) - episode: The Mischpoche
2010: Charly's Comeback
2011: Family Makes You Happy
2015: Schellen-Ursli
2017: The Undertaker (TV Series) - Season 5, Episode 2
2018: Amur senza fin

References

External links 
 

Living people
1972 births
20th-century Swiss actresses
21st-century Swiss actresses
People from Scuol
Romansh people
Swiss film actresses
Swiss stage actresses
Swiss television actresses